C. marginatus may refer to:
 Callinectes marginatus, the sharptooth swimcrab or marbled swimcrab
 Charadrius marginatus, the white-fronted plover or white-fronted sandplover
Chauliognathus marginatus, the margined soldier beetle
 Cladodus marginatus, a prehistoric fish species
 Coreus marginatus, the dock bug
 Cryptanthus marginatus, a plant species endemic to Brazil

See also